Odou is a village in the Larnaca District of Cyprus, 8 km northwest of Ora. Its population in 2011 was 213.

Odou takes its name from the ancient road running from Amathous (Agios Tykhonas) on the south coast to Tamassos (Politiko), which passes through the village.

Odou is a traditional Cypriot village.

References

Communities in Larnaca District